The Nam Pak Hong, also Nam Pei Hong and Nam Bac Hang (literally, "South-North Trading Association"), was a combination of individual hongs, or trading houses, the traditional form of business organization in China. They represented Chinese merchants who were often associated with overseas trade, both the "Gold Mountain" trade with the United States and Australia, and the older trade in the Nanyang. The association was established in 1868 in Hong Kong by merchants from various dialect groups and its influence quickly expanded.

See also
 Economy of Hong Kong
 Economic history of China

References

 Jung-Fang Tsai. Hong Kong in Chinese History: Community and Social Unrest in the British Colony, 1842-1913. Columbia University Press, 1995.

External links
 Trading rules of Nam Pak Hong

Chinese diaspora
Economy of the Qing dynasty
Sheung Wan
Economic history of China